The  was a Japanese domain of the Edo period, located in Bitchū Province.

List of lords
 Itō Nagazane (伊東 長実)
 Itō Nagamasa (伊東 長昌)
 Itō Nagaharu (伊東 長治)
 Itō Nagasada (伊東 長貞)
 Itō Nagahira (伊東 長救)
 Itō Nagaoka (伊東 長丘)
 Itō Nagatoshi (伊東 長詮)
 Itō Nagatomo (伊東 長寛)
 Itō Nagayasu (伊東 長裕)
 Itō Nagatoshi (伊東 長)

Domains of Japan